The Tokina Firin 20mm f/2.0 FE MF is a full-frame wide-angle manual focus lens for the Sony E-mount, announced by Tokina on September 8, 2016. It is the first in a new line of Tokina lenses optimized for Sony E-mount, and currently the only Tokina lens offered for Sony full-frame cameras.

Though designed for Sony's full frame E-mount cameras, the lens can be used on Sony's APS-C E-mount camera bodies, with an equivalent full-frame field-of-view of 30mm.

Build quality
The lens features a solid aluminum body with a detachable cinema-style lens hood. The lens showcases a minimalist black exterior with an aperture de-click ring, aperture ring, and focus ring. Despite being a manual focus lens, the lens transmits full Exif data to the camera body.

Image quality
The lens is very sharp from its maximum aperture of f/2, with only a slight fall-off in acuity toward the edges of the frame. Distortion and chromatic aberration are all well controlled. However, the lens suffers from mild vignetting.

The lens also excels at low-light photography given its fast maximum aperture of f/2.0 and exceptional coma control. In addition, having a wide-angle field-of view allows for longer exposures to be taken of stars without the effect of star trails affecting the resultant image.

See also
 List of third-party E-mount lenses
List of Sony E-mount lenses
Zeiss Loxia 2.8/21mm

References

Camera lenses introduced in 2016
20